Ikić is a Croatian surname. Notable people with the surname include: 

 Frane Ikić (born 1994), footballer
 Ivan Ikić (born 1999), footballer
 Kristina Ikić Baniček (born 1975), politician
 Matea Ikić (born 1989), volleyballer

Croatian surnames